Edward J (Ned) Walsh (1861 – 1939) was an Ireland international rugby union player. 

A native of Graiguenahown, Abbeyleix, County Laois, he was the first former Blackrock College student to win an Irish rugby international cap and was capped seven times for Ireland between 1885 and 1893.

He was also a member of Lansdowne Football Club.

Notes

1861 births
Irish rugby union players
Ireland international rugby union players
Blackrock College RFC players
Rugby union players from County Laois
People educated at Blackrock College
1939 deaths